Sangharsh may refer to:

 Sangharsh (1999 film), a Bollywood psychological crime thriller film
 Sangharsh (2014 film), a Marathi drama road film
 Sangharsh (2018 film), a 2018 Bhojpuri language film
 Sangharsh (TV series), a 2017 Hindi drama television series
 Sunghursh, a 1968 Hindi film